The Jonang is one of the schools of Tibetan Buddhism. Its origins in Tibet can be traced to early 12th century master Yumo Mikyo Dorje, but became much wider known with the help of Dolpopa Sherab Gyaltsen, a monk originally trained in the Sakya school. The Jonang school’s main practice comes from the Kalachakra cycle.

The Jonang re-established their religio-political center in Golok, Nakhi and Mongol areas of Kham and Amdo with the school's seat at Dzamtang Tsangwa dzong and have continued practicing uninterrupted to this day. An estimated 5,000 monks and nuns of the Jonang tradition practice today in these areas. However, their teachings were limited to these regions until the Rimé movement of the 19th century encouraged the study of non-Gelug schools of thought and practice.

History
The Jonang tradition took its name from this monastery, which was significantly expanded by Dolpopa Sherab Gyaltsen (1292–1361).

The Jonang tradition combines two specific teachings, what has come to be known as the shentong philosophy of śūnyatā, and the Dro lineage of the Kalachakra Tantra. The origin of this combination in Tibet is traced to the master Yumo Mikyo Dorje, an 11th/12th century pupil of the Kashmiri master Somanatha.

The Jonang school generated a number of renowned Buddhist scholars, like Dolpopa Sherab Gyaltsen, but its most famous was Taranatha (1575–1634), who placed great emphasis on the Kalachakra Tantra.

Reasons for suppression of the Jonangpa

Doctrinal 
While the Gelugpa embraced the Jonang teaching on the Kalachakra, they ultimately opposed the Jonangpa (followers of the Jonang) over a difference in philosophical view. Yumo Mikyo Dorje, Dolpopa Sherab Gyeltsen and subsequent lamas maintained shentong teachings, which hold that only the clear-light, non-dual nature of the mind is real and everything else is empty of inherent existence. The Gelug school held the distinct but related rangtong view that all phenomena are empty (of inherent existence) and no thing or process (including Mind and its qualities) may be asserted as independent or inherently real (neither may phenomena be asserted as "unreal".

For the Jonangpas, the emptiness of ultimate reality should not be characterized in the same way as the emptiness of apparent phenomena because it is prabhāsvara-saṃtāna, or "clear light mental continuum," endowed with limitless Buddha qualities. It is empty of all that is false, not empty of the limitless Buddha qualities that are its innate nature.

Political
Modern historians have identified two other reasons which more likely led the Gelugpa to suppress the Jonangpa. First, the Jonangpa had political ties that were very vexing to the Gelugpa. The Jonang school, along with the Kagyu, were historical allies with the powerful house of Tsangpa, which was vying with the Dalai Lama and the Gelug school for control of Central Tibet. This was bad enough, but soon after the death of Taranatha, an even more ominous event occurred. Taranatha's tulku was discovered to be a young boy named Zanabazar, the son of Tüsheet Khan, Prince of Central Khalkha. Tüsheet Khan and his son were of Borjigin lineage (the imperial clan of Genghis Khan and his successors), meaning they had the birth authority to become khagan. When the young boy was declared the spiritual leader of all of Mongolia, suddenly the Gelugpa were faced with the possibility of war with the former military superpower of Asia. While the Mongol Empire was long past its zenith, this was nonetheless a frightening prospect and the Dalai Lama sought the first possible moment of Mongol distraction to take control of the Jonangpa monasteries.

The 14th Dalai Lama confirmed this view in Glenn Mullin's The Fourteen Dalai Lamas:

The writings of Dolpopa Sherab Gyaltsen and even those of Sakya proponents of zhentong were sealed and banned from publication and study and that Jonangpa monastics were forcibly converted to the Gelug lineage.

Rediscovery
The Jonangpa were until recently thought to be an extinct heretical sect. Thus, Tibetologists were astonished when fieldwork turned up several active Jonangpa monasteries, including the main monastery, Tsangwa, located in Zamtang County, Sichuan. Almost 40 monasteries, comprising about 5000 monks, have subsequently been found, including some in the Amdo Tibetan and rGyalgrong areas of Qinghai, Sichuan and Tibet.

One of the primary supporters of the Jonang lineage in exile has been the 14th Dalai Lama of the Gelugpa lineage. The Dalai Lama donated buildings in Himachal Pradesh state in Shimla, India for use as a Jonang monastery (now known as the Main Takten Phuntsok Choeling Monastery) and has visited during one of his recent teaching tours. The Karmapa of the Karma Kagyu lineage has also visited there.

The Jonang tradition has recently officially registered with the Tibetan Government in exile to be recognized as the fifth living Buddhist tradition of Tibetan Buddhism. The 14th Dalai Lama assigned Jebtsundamba Khutuktu of Mongolia (who is considered to be an incarnation of Taranatha) as the leader of the Jonang tradition.

Much of the literature of the Jonang has also survived, including the Treatise on Other-Emptiness and the Buddha-Matrix  by Dolpopa, consisting of arguments (all supported by quotations taken from the generally accepted orthodox canonical ) against "self-emptiness" and in favor of "other-emptiness", which has been published in English translation under the title Mountain Doctrine.

Works emphasized by Jonang (Dolpopa)

The Ten Primary Tathagathagarbha Sutras /Essence Sutras (Syning po'i mdo)

According to Dolpopa, Reply to Questions (344-45), and:
 Tathāgatagarbha Sūtra (Engl: Sutra on the Tathagata Essence, Tib. )
 Avikalpapraveśadhāraṇī (Engl: Dharani for Entering the Nonconceptual; Tib. )
 Śrīmālādevī Siṃhanāda Sūtra (Engl. Sutra of the Lions Roar of Srimaladevi)
 Mahābherīsūtra (Sutra of the Great Drum)
 Aṅgulimālīya Sūtra (Sutra to Benefit Angulimala)
 Śūnyatānāmamahāsūtra (Sutra of Great Emptiness)
 Tathāgatamahākaruṇānirdeśasūtra (aka Dhāraṇīśvararājasūtra)  (Sutra Presenting the Great Compassion of the Tathagata)
 Tathāgataguṇajñānācintyaviṣayāvatāranirdeśasūtra (Sutra Presenting the Inconceivable Qualities and Primordial Awareness of the Tathagata)
 Mahāmeghasūtra (Extensive Sutra of the Great Cloud)
 Parinirvāṇasūtra and Mahāyāna Mahāparinirvāṇa Sūtra (these two are counted as one) (Sutra of Great Nirvana)

alternativ:
Tathāgatagarbha Sūtra
Ãryadhāraṇīśvararāja Sūtra [also known as the Tathāgatamahākaruṇānirdeśa Sūtra]
Mahāparinirvāṇa Sūtra
Aṅgulimālīya Sūtra
Śrīmālādevīsiṃhanāda Sūtra
Jñānalokālaṃkāra Sūtra
Anunatra-pūrṇatvānirdeśaparivarta Sūtra
Mahābheri Sūtra
Avikalpapraveśadhāraṇī Sūtra
Saṃdhinirmocana Sūtra

Five/Ten Sutras of Definite Meaning (Nges don mdo)
normal:
 Pañcaśatikāprajñāpāramitāsūtra (Perfection of Wisdom in 500 Lines)
 the “Maitreya Chapter” (Maitreya's Questions in 18000 bzw 25000 Lines Prajnaparamita Sutra) 
 Ghanavyūhasūtra (tib. Rgyan btug po'i mdo)
 Praśāntaviniścayaprātihāryanāmasamādhisūtra (Sutra on Utterly Quiescent and Certain Magical Meditative Concentrations) 
 Ratnameghasūtra (Clouds of Jewels Sutra)
expanded:
 Suvarṇaprabhāsottamasūtra (eng. Great Excellent Golden Light, tib. Gser 'od dam chen)
 Saṃdhinirmocanasūtra (Definite Commentary on the Intenion)
 Laṅkāvatāra Sūtra
 Sarvabuddhaviṣayāvatārajñānālokālaṃkārasūtra (Sutra Ornament of the Appearance...)
 Buddhāvataṃsakasūtra (Avatamsaka Sutra, Flower Ornament Sutra)

Five works of Maitreya
 Abhisamayalankara
 Mahayanasutralankara
 Ratnagotravibhāga
 Dharmadharmatavibhanga
 Madhyantavibhanga

The Bodhisattva Trilogy (sems 'grel skor gsum) 

Vimalaprabha (engl: A Stainless Light, Toh 1347) from Kalki Pundariki a Commentary about : The Abbre. Kalachakra 
Hevajrapindarthakika (Toh 1180) from Vajragarbha a Commentary about The Tantra in two Forms (Hevajra)
Laksabhidhanaduddhrtalaghutantrapindarthavivarana (Toh 1402) from Vajrapani a Commentary about Chakrasamvara

Prajñāpāramitā Commentaries 
According to Dolpopa:
The Question of Maitreya, Sanskrit: Maitreyaparipṛcchā; Tib: , Author: Shakyamuni 
Long Explanation of Perfect Wisdom Sutra in 100000 Lines; Tib: , Author: , (Gn1/Peking 5202/TOH 3807)
Mahāprajñāpāramitā Sūtra in 100000, 25000 and 18000 Lines, Sanskrit: Śatasāhasrikā Prajñāpāramitā Sūtra, Pañcaviṃśatisāhasrikā Prajñāpāramitā Sūtra, and Aṣṭadaśasāhasrikā Prajñāpāramitā Sūtra: Tib: , Author: Vasubhandu, translator: Yeshe De (Gn2, Peking 5206/ TOH 3808) 
Amnayanusarini  (bhagavatiyamnayanusarini—nāmavyākhyāna), Author: Zhi na ‘byung gnas, “the glorious king, the foremost guru living in Jagaddala, the master Santasambhava/Santyakara (TOH 3811)
Prajñāpāramitā-piṇḍārtha, Author: Dignāga (TOH 3797)

Dolpopa's complete works 
Dolpopa's complete works in 13 volumes, Pe Cin edition

Dolpopa's complete works in 8 volumes, 'Dzam Thang edition

Dolpopa's complete works in 1 volumes, Gyantse edition

Dolpopa's related videos 
Dolpopa biography - against all odds (1)

Dolpopa's Empty-of-other view is found in sutras.

Notes

References
 
 Gruschke, A. (2000). The Jonangpa Order - Causes for the downfall, conditions of the survival and current situation of a presumably extinct Tibetan-Buddhist School. Ninth Seminar of The International Association for Tibetan Studies

External links
Jonang Dharma Association
Jonang Dharma Channel

 
Vaipulya Sutras
Schools of Tibetan Buddhism
Shentong